Daud Khan (1912–1979) was a cricket player and umpire. He played for the Sindh cricket team before and after Pakistan's independence from India. He later became a Test umpire.

Playing career
Daud played 20 first-class matches as a middle-order batsman for Sind between 1936 and 1947. His highest score was 74 not out against Bombay in the Ranji Trophy in 1938-39.

Umpiring career
Khan umpired 136 first-class matches in Pakistan between 1948 and 1976, most of them in Karachi, including nine finals in the Quaid-e-Azam Trophy. Between 1955 and 1973, he officiated in 14 Tests. Along with Idrees Baig he stood in the first Test ever played in Pakistan, the First Test against India in Dacca beginning on New Year's Day 1955.

The Daud Khan Memorial Cricket Tournament, a 40-over competition held annually among clubs in Karachi, is named in his honour.

References

External links
 Daud Khan at CricketArchive
 Daud Khan at Cricinfo

1912 births
1979 deaths
Pakistani Test cricket umpires
Pakistani cricketers
Sindh cricketers
Cricketers from Karachi